Synapturanus is a genus of microhylid frogs. They are found in northern South America. Common name disc frogs has been coined for the genus. Because of their fossorial life style, their natural history is poorly known.

Ecology and behavior
Synapturanus are fossorial and mostly nocturnal tropical rainforest frogs found in the leaf litter and soft soils. Calling takes place usually during rain, which apparently triggers the calling. Eggs are deposited terrestrially in a small burrow below the soil surface. The tadpoles are endotrophic (developing without external food sources). Stomach contents have included nematodes and various arthropods (ants, termites, and spiders).

Description
Females are larger than males. Breeding males have a glandular swelling on the wrist. Males and females are otherwise similar. The largest species is Synapturanus mirandaribeiroi, which reaches a snout–vent length of at least .

Species
This genus has seven recognized species:

Another type of Synapturanus nicknamed "The Plump Digger" was discovered by scientists in the Pico da Neblina National Park, Brazil in 2018.

References

 
Microhylidae
Amphibian genera
Taxa named by Antenor Leitão de Carvalho
Amphibians of South America